Ib Christian Albert von Cotta Schønberg (23 October 1902 – 24 September 1955) was a Danish film actor, and is considered one of the leading actors of Danish film in the 20th century.

Early life 
The son of a chemist, Ib Schønberg was interested in acting from an early age.  He made his debut in 1920 and worked for more than ten years as a stage actor.

Career 
Schønberg made his screen debut in Benjamin Christensen's 1922 horror/documentary Häxan. By the 1930s he was an established comic actor, often in main roles as leaders of buffoon duos, well-meaning policemen, or more substantial "uncle types". During World War II he suddenly appeared as a dramatic actor, and from then until his death he maintained his position as one of the greatest actors of Danish art films, playing serious roles alongside comic roles.

He was well known for his ability to perform "the colossus with feet of clay", apparently solid and superior characters – both sympathetic and unsympathetic – who fall apart by the end of the film. Among his best-known serious performances are his mean-cultivated informer type in Afsporet (1942 – Derailed); his leader af a children's home, a sadist with shattered nerves in the social film Kampen mod uretten (1949 – The Struggle Against Injustice) and his two portraits of alcoholics in Ta’ hvad du vil ha’ (1947 – Take What You Want) and Café Paradis (1951). In his later years he was a regular participant in the so-called "Morten Korch films" (based upon the regional novels of a very popular Danish light literate) often placed as the fatherly friend of the hero and his serial role as a widower with children in the popular Far til fire (The Father of Four) films.

Apart from a few Swedish movies, Schønberg made only Danish films. In 1940, he was offered the role of Martin Luther in a Hollywood production, but he turned it down.

In 1949, Schønberg took part in every Danish film of that year, and during the last six years of his life (1949–1955) he appeared in almost 60 films. It was a saying about him, that if 10 Danish films were made, he would be in the 11 of them. He was an active public figure, appearing at the opening of exhibitions, and freely providing the press with interviews about his ideas and projects. Schønberg, with his volatile temper and often transient commitment to projects, felt best suited to working in films rather than theatre. However, he occasionally performed on stage and during his last years he was director of the "Circus Revue".

Death 
He contracted pneumonia in May 1955 and remained bed-ridden until he died on 24 September 1955.

Awards 
In 1948, Schønberg won the Bodil Award for Best Supporting Actor for his role as Oscar Bergholtz in the film Ta' hvad du vil há (English title: Take What You Want). He again received the Bodil for Best Supporting Actor in 1951 for the film Café Paradis (Paradise Cafe).

Filmography 

 Häxan (1922)
  (1930)
 De blaa drenge (1933)
 Københavnere (1933)
 Ud i den kolde sne (1934)
  (1934)
 København, Kalundborg og - ? (1934)
 Weekend (1935)
  (1935)
 Kidnapped (1935)
 Bag Københavns kulisser (1935)
 Snushanerne (1936)
 Panserbasse (1936)
  (1936)
  (1937)
 Inkognito (1937)
  (1937)
  (1939)
 I dag begynder livet (1939)
 Pas på svinget i Solby (1940)
 En ganske almindelig pige (1940)
 Familien Olsen (1940)
 Frøken Kirkemus (1941)
 Tag til Rønneby kro (1941)
 Far skal giftes (1941)
  (1941)
  (1942)
 Afsporet (1942)
  (1942)
  (1942)
 Tyrannens fald (1942)
 Frk. Vildkat (1942)
  (1943)
 En pige uden lige (1943)
 Det ender med bryllup (1943)
 Hans onsdagsveninde (1943)
  (1944)
 Otte akkorder (1944)
 Elly Petersen (1944)
 Teatertosset (1944)
  (1944)
 Mordets melodi (1944)
 De kloge og vi gale (1945)
  (1945)
 Panik i familien (1945)
 Affæren Birte (1945)
 Jeg elsker en anden (1946)
 Brita in the Merchant's House (1946)
  (1946)
  (1946)
 Ta' hvad du vil há (1947)
  (1947)
  (1947)
 The Swedenhielm Family (1947)
 Lise kommer til byen (1947)
 Mani (1947)
  (1948)
  (1948)
  (1948)
 Vi vil ha' et barn (1949)
  (1949)
  (1949)
 Kampen mod uretten (1949)
  (1949)
  (1949)
 Det gælder os alle (1949)
  (1949)
 De røde heste – 1950 (1950)
 I gabestokken (1950)
 Mosekongen (1950)
  (1950)
 Den opvakte jomfru (1950)
  (1950)
 Susanne (1950)
 Café Paradis (1950)
  (1950)
 Fodboldpræsten (1951)
  (1951)
  (1951)
 Det sande ansigt (1951)
  (1951)
  (1951)
 Det gamle guld (1951)
  (1951)
  (1951)
  (1952)
 Mød mig på Cassiopeia (1951)
  (1951)
 Dorte (1951)
 Det store løb (1952)
 Vi arme syndere (1952)
  (1952)
  (1952)
 Rekrut 67 Petersen (1952)
 Husmandstøsen (1952)
 Min søn Peter (1953)
 Sønnen (1953)
 Hejrenæs (1953)
 Far til Fire (1953)
 Ved Kongelunden (1953)
 We Who Go the Kitchen Route (1953)
 The Old Mill on Mols (1953)
 Fløjtespilleren (1953)
 The Crime of Tove Andersen (1953)
 Far til fire i sneen (1954)
 Hendes store aften (1954)
  (1954)
 I kongens klær (1954)
  (1954)
 Arvingen (1954)
 En sømand går i land (1954)
 Troll i ord (1954)
 Far och flyg (1955)
 Blændværk (1955)
  (1955)
  (1955)

References 

 Schønberg, Bent and Kai Berg Madsen; Ib Schønberg – en mindebog; (1955)
 Stegelmann, Jørgen; - og Ib Schønberg; (1996).

External links 
 
 
 Det Danske Filminstitut (In Danish)

1902 births
1955 deaths
20th-century Danish male actors
Best Supporting Actor Bodil Award winners
Danish male film actors
Danish male silent film actors
Deaths from pneumonia in Denmark
Male actors from Copenhagen